Emanuel Ghazazian, known as Emil Kazaz (born January 14, 1953, in Gyumri, Armenia) is an American-Armenian figurative sculptor and painter.

He was awarded one of the 5 sculpture gold medals at the Florence Biennale in 2003.

The Los Angeles Times commented on Kazaz work at an art exhibition, "One of the most striking pieces in this sprawling show is Emil Kazaz's, Hang Horse,".

Kazaz currently resides in Los Angeles, USA.

References

Further reading
Igitian, Henrik, and Joe Lewis. Emil Kazaz. Yerevan: Tigran Mets, 2004. Print.
Emil Kazaz. 2011. 15 Apr. 2012.
Sarkissian, Artem. "Emil Kazaz Interview." YouTube. Web. 15 Apr. 2012.

External links
Emil Kazaz's biography

American sculptors
People from Gyumri
1953 births
Living people
Armenian painters